Pantazi is a Greek surname. Notable people with the surname include:
Angeliki Pantazi (born 1982), Greek computer engineer
Charikleia Pantazi (born 1985), Greek rhythmic gymnast
Cleopatra Pantazi (born 1963), Greek singer
Elissavet Pantazi (born 1956), Greek hurdler

See also
Pantazis, another Greek surname
Pantazi Ghica (1831–1882), Romanian politician and writer
Valeriu Pantazi (1940–2015), born Pantazie Valeriu Constantinescu, Romanian painter and writer

Greek-language surnames